Theophanu was the abbess of the convents of Essen and Gerresheim from 1039 until her death in 1058. She was the daughter of Matilda of Germany and a granddaughter of the Byzantine princess Theophanu and the Holy Roman Emperor Otto II.

During her abbacy, Theophanu was responsible for a number of artistic and architectural commissions, including the renovation of the west end of Münster church to reflect the design of the famous octagonal Aachen Chapel.  She donated several lavish illuminated manuscripts, including the Theophanu Gospels (now in the Essen Cathedral Treasury) and the Cross of Theophanu.

References

External links

  Rheinische Geschichte: Theophanu (um 997–1058), Äbtissin von Essen und Gerresheim (1039–1056)
 Webpage of the Essen cathedral treasury for the cross nail reliquary

1058 deaths
Abbesses of Essen